Turnbull & Asser is a British shirt-maker that was established in 1885. The company has its flagship store on Jermyn Street in the St James's area of London, and its bespoke store around the corner on Bury Street. Turnbull & Asser also has a location at 4 Davies Street in Mayfair. In addition to the three London stores, the company has a shop in New York City.

History
The business was founded in 1885 by John Arthur Turnbull, a hosier and shirt-maker, at 3 Church Place, St James's. Turnbull met Ernest Asser, a salesman, later on in 1893. Together, they opened a hosiery under the name "John Arthur Turnbull" in St James's located in England. As the neighborhood was the site of numerous gentlemen's clubs and high-end haberdashers, the business flourished. The name was changed to "Turnbull & Asser" in 1895.

In 1903, after continued success, Turnbull & Asser moved to its present location at the corner of Jermyn Street and Bury Street. In 1915, during World War I, Turnbull & Asser developed a raincoat which doubled as a sleeping bag for the British military. It is known as the Oilsilk Combination Coverall & Ground Sheet. 

Between the 1920s and the 1970s, Turnbull & Asser grew its London business from a haberdashery to a clothier, expanding into sportswear, clothing (both bespoke and ready-to-wear), and ready-to-wear shirts. As its symbol, it used a hunting horn with a "Q" above, which it called the Quorn, a name it shares with one of the oldest hunts in England. Many of Turnbull & Asser's articles were called by this name, such as the popular "Quorn scarf".

During the 1960s, Turnbull & Asser was known for catering to the Swinging London set, with vibrant colors and modern designs. In 1962, Turnbull & Asser began to outfit the cinematic James Bond as first portrayed by Sean Connery, whose dress shirts had turnback cuffs fastened with buttons as opposed to cufflinks, referred to as "cocktail cuffs" or "James Bond cuffs".

In the 1970s and 1980s, Turnbull & Asser began reviving some of the more traditional aspects of its business. The company found that Americans increasingly were buying its wares, so it began offering trunk shows at the Grand Hyatt in New York City. Beginning in 1974, Turnbull & Asser sold ready-to-wear shirts in the United States through department stores Bonwit Teller and Neiman Marcus. For a brief period beginning in 1979, Turnbull & Asser even operated a small store in Toronto.  Turnbull & Asser also opened a location in Beverly Hills in 2003 before closing several years later.

In February 2018, Turnbull & Asser posted a £1.2 Million pound loss, leading to a £1m equity injection from its owner, Ali Fayed.

Royal Warrant
Charles III has bought shirts from Turnbull & Asser since his youth. When, in 1980, the then Prince of Wales was granted the power of bestowing royal warrants, his first issue was granted to Turnbull & Asser. He also wears Turnbull & Asser suits, made by the former Chester Barrie factory in Crewe, Cheshire. Following the retirement of Paul Cuss, the Royal Warrant was passed down to Steven Quin, who currently heads the bespoke department in Bury Street.

Today
Shirts and ties are still made in its Gloucester factory.

In addition to its retail stores, the company hosts seasonal bespoke shirt trunkshows in key cities around the world, including Los Angeles, Chicago, Toronto, Mumbai, Seoul, Tokyo, Singapore, Hong Kong and more.

In response to the COVID-19 pandemic, Turnbull & Asser dedicated its Gloucester workroom to making medical-grade uniforms for National Health Service personnel.

See also
 Crockett & Jones
 G Ettinger Ltd.
 Floris of London
 James Bond
 Jermyn Street
 Kingsman (franchise)

References

Clothing brands of the United Kingdom
Clothing companies based in London
Retail companies established in 1885
High fashion brands
Luxury brands
British Royal Warrant holders
Shops in London
Suit makers
1885 establishments in England
1885 establishments in the United Kingdom
Clothing companies of England
Clothing retailers of England